The discography of Tiwa Savage, a Nigerian singer consists of three studio albums, one compilation album, 23 singles (including seven as featured artist), ten music videos, four promotional single, five guest appearances, and one cameo appearance.

Albums

Studio albums

EPs

Compilation albums

Singles

As lead artist

As featured artist

Promotional singles

Guest appearances

Cameo appearances

Music videos

As lead artist

As featured artist

References

Discographies of Nigerian artists